Idealistic Studies is a triannual peer-reviewed academic journal covering studies of idealistic themes. Both historical and contemporary statements of idealistic argumentation are published, as are also historico-philosophical studies of idealism. The journal was established in 1971 by Robert N. Beck with the assistance of the Clark University philosophy department. Initially focused on American personalism and post-Kantian idealism, the journal's mission has broadened to include other topics, including historically earlier expressions as well as developments of the late 19th to mid-20th century. The journal has become a venue for a number of philosophical movements that share Idealism in their genealogies, including phenomenology, neo-Kantianism, historicism, hermeneutics, life philosophy, existentialism, and pragmatism. It is published by the Philosophy Documentation Center and the editor-in-chief is Jennifer Bates (Duquesne University).

Abstracting and indexing
The journal is abstracted and indexed in:

See also
List of philosophy journals

References

External links

English-language journals
Philosophy journals
Triannual journals
Publications established in 1971
Philosophy Documentation Center academic journals